Keletso Sifama (born 1 January 2003) is a South African soccer player currently playing as a midfielder for Kaizer Chiefs.

He arrived at Chiefs in 2018, playing in the Gauteng Development League, before being promoted to the Reserve League Team under coach Arthur Zwane’s mentorship at the start of the season. He made his senior debut as a substitute coming on in the 86th minute of an exciting thrill-a-minute win over Polokwane City on Saturday, 15 August 2020.

He became the youngest player to debut at Kaizer Chiefs, breaking Wiseman Meyiwa's record of 17 years, 8 months and 17 days.

Career statistics

Club

Notes

References

2003 births
Living people
South African soccer players
Association football midfielders
South African Premier Division players
Kaizer Chiefs F.C. players